Pterochitina is an extinct genus of chitinozoans. It was described by Alfred Eisenack in 1955.

Species
 Pterochitina macroptera Eisenack, 1959
 Pterochitina perivelata (Eisenack, 1937)
 Pterochitina retracta Eisenack, 1955

References

Prehistoric marine animals
Fossil taxa described in 1955